Paula Andrea Betancur Arroyave (born June 1, 1972) is a Colombian former beauty queen and model. Betancur represented the department of Amazonas in the 1992 National Beauty Contest and was elected Miss Colombia 1992.

Pageantry

Miss Universe 1993
Betancur represented Colombia in Miss Universe 1993 held in Mexico. From the beginning of the competition, she was a favorite for the crown. During the live broadcast of the pageant, it was revealed that she earned the highest preliminary interview score of all contestants (9.70). She made it to the top 10, earning the highest score in the evening gown competition. Despite her high scores and loud support from the audience, she ended up as first runner up (second place). Paula Andrea is one of three Miss Colombia title holders to become Miss Universe's first runner up three times in a row. The previous year, Paola Turbay got second place in the Miss Universe 1992 competition, and the following year, Carolina Gómez was first runner up in the Miss Universe 1994  pageant.

Career 
After her reign, she devoted herself to the catwalk as a model of big brands like Gianni Versace. It was cover of the Italian magazine Gioia. She participated in the 20-04 Challenge, which was the winner and the 2015, returns to participate again in the reality Challenge 2015, this time in the country of India. She debuted as an actress in the comedy Two Much, whose protagonist was Antonio Banderas and Melanie Griffith, Spanish director Fernando Trubas. She became part of modeling Colombian companies as Klass Models and signed with L'Agence in the United States.

Paula Andrea ventured into the life of an entrepreneur by setting up a restaurant for salads and fast foods, but realized that this was not her thing and launched herself with her line of bathing gowns. In addition, it has a line of beauty composed by moisturizing oils and moisturizing for the skin (Paula Andrea Secrets).

Her most recent work as a model was for the magazine Donjuán. It was in the group of hopefuls to star in the telenovela Summer in Venice the RCN channel , but was finally chosen another actress.

She was married to Juan Carlos Villegas, whom she divorced in 2008. They had three children: Mateo, Salomé and Simón.

References

1972 births
American actresses
American people of Colombian descent
Colombian actresses
Colombian female models
Colombian television presenters
Living people
Miss Colombia winners
Miss Universe 1993 contestants
Colombian women television presenters
21st-century American women